The Jiuyin Zhenjing, also known as the Nine Yin Manual, is a fictional martial arts manual in Jin Yong's Condor Trilogy.

History
The manual is a compilation of numerous scrolls and ancient scriptures pertaining to psychic powers, healing techniques, martial arts classics and Taoist philosophy. It was compiled by Huang Shang (黃裳) on the commission of Emperor Huizong during the Song Dynasty. Huang's compendium became the first volume of the manual. During the writing process, Huang enriched himself with Taoist knowledge and the principles of inner energy and qi. When combined with Huang's intelligence, the knowledge he acquired during the compilation turned him into a formidable martial artist.

Soon after, the emperor appointed Huang to lead an army to eradicate the Ming Cult, a martial arts school of Persian origin that had been involved in many anti-government activities. The Song army engaged the cult in a fierce battle but failed to capture the enemy's fortress. Huang fought with the cult's best fighters one-on-one and slew every single one of them until he was forced to retreat due to exhaustion. In retaliation, the Ming Cult dispatched the best of its surviving warriors to kill Huang's family.

Huang was enraged and he vowed to destroy the cult. For the next four decades, Huang dedicated himself to experimenting with new techniques to counter those of the Ming Cult's martial arts. As many of the cult's members were affiliated to other schools, Huang had to develop new techniques that were capable of countering the other schools' martial arts as well.

Huang succeeded in accomplishing his herculean task but his enemies had died during those four decades. Huang wrote the second volume of the manual, detailing his experiences and the new techniques he had developed and innovated during his 40 years of research. Earlier edition of The Legend of the Condor Heroes has the creator being Bodhidharma.

First martial arts contest on Mount Hua
The manual was lost for several years after Huang Shang's death. When it reappeared in the jianghu, it induced bloodshed as martial artists competed fiercely with each other to seize possession of the anthology of martial arts. Numerous lives were lost due to the ensuing chaos caused by the obsession with the book. To prevent further spilling of blood, martial artists decided to stage a martial arts contest on Mount Hua to determine who would be the manual's rightful owner. The Five Greats ("Central Divine" Wang Chongyang, "Eastern Heretic" Huang Yaoshi, "Western Venom" Ouyang Feng, "Northern Beggar" Hong Qigong and "Southern Emperor" Duan Zhixing) gathered on Mount Hua and agreed that the champion of the contest would gain sole possession of the manual.

After an intense competition that lasted seven days, Wang Chongyang emerged as overall champion and won the manual for himself. Wang incorporated some of the manual's underlying principles into the martial arts of his Quanzhen School, most notably the Big Dipper Formation. He left a part of the manual that held the key to defeating the skills of the Ancient Tomb School in the tomb of his lover and rival Lin Chaoying.

Before his death, Wang passed the manual to his junior Zhou Botong, warning the latter not to let the manual fall into wrong hands. Ouyang Feng had previously attempted to seize the manual during Wang's funeral after the latter's apparent death. However, Wang had faked his own death and he caught Ouyang completely by surprise. Ouyang was defeated and he fled. Wang also laid down a regulation that no member of Quanzhen is permitted to learn and use any of the skills in the manual.

Peach Blossom  Island
After Wang Chongyang's death, Zhou Botong travelled to Peach Blossom Island, where Huang Yaoshi lives, to warn Huang not to think about stealing the manual. Huang tricked Zhou into allowing his wife Feng Heng to have a glance at the manual. Feng had eidetic memory and she memorised the text of the second volume after browsing through it once. She lied to Zhou that the manual was worthless, by reciting the text and claiming that it came from a book of childish rites she had read before. Zhou believed her and destroyed the book in anger. After Zhou Botong left, Feng Heng wrote a copy of the manual from memory for her husband.

Two years later, Huang's disciples Chen Xuanfeng and Mei Chaofeng decided to elope as they fear that their teacher might oppose their relationship. They stole Huang's copy of the manual and fled from Peach Blossom Island. Huang was furious when he found out and he broke the legs of his other four students in anger and banished them from his island. Feng re-wrote the second volume of the manual from memory for her husband fearing that she would forget the manual and miss out on certain parts, which Huang would not be glad with as Huang was a martial arts maniac. However, tragedy struck as Feng rushed days and nights to finish the manual. It was to exhausting for her and after finishing the manual and giving birth, she died. Huang Yaoshi was filled with grief and he vowed to kill anyone who dared to learn anything from the book that cost the life of his beloved wife.

Meanwhile, Zhou Botong realised that he had been fooled by Huang Yaoshi and he returned to Peach Blossom Island to confront Huang. He kept pestering and harassing Huang to hand the book to him. Huang was unable to defeat Zhou and could only imprison the latter on his island by sealing off all exit routes using a formation, a formation created by Huang using peach blossom and his knowledge of the Bagua and five elements. As for Chen Xuanfeng and Mei Chaofeng, they started practising the skills in the manual but had interpreted wrongly the underlying principles and mastered an unorthodox version of the skill, 'Nine Yin White Bone Claw' (九陰白骨爪). The manual read that the fingers/claw of the person would sink into the fatal points of the enemy, but they misinterpreted thinking the way to use this skill was to require human sacrifices during practice and hence instills fear in many martial artists by mere mention of its name. The original interpretation was to target the fatal points of the person, such as, by piercing the user's finger into the skull of the enemy and thus they do not truly master the skill. Apart from that, the couple also learned the 'Heart Shattering Palm' (摧心掌) and Mei mastered the 'White Boa Whip Skill' (白蟒鞭法). Chen and Mei became known as the "Twin Killers in the Dark Wind" for using those skills to commit heinous crimes and terrorize the jianghu. In the process of learning these skills they did not have sufficient inner energy and hence rushed the process of cultivating a strong inner energy by eating arsenic and forcing it out of their body. Arsenic was the most commonly known, strongest poison in ancient Chinese.

The couple settled in Mongolia to avoid pursuit from their enemies in China. They met Guo Jing and the "Seven Freaks of Jiangnan" and engaged in a fierce battle. Chen was stabbed and killed by Guo for underestimating Guo as a child, while Mei was blinded by Ke Zhen'e's poison darts, but she managed to flee with her husband's dead body. As Chen had tattooed the text of the manual on his chest, Mei skins her dead husband and takes the grisly text with her. She later meets Yang Kang, who offers her shelter in an underground room in his house, and she teaches him the 'Nine Yin White Bone Claw' in return.

Guo Jing
Years later Mei Chaofeng encounters Guo Jing and the "Seven Freaks of Jiangnan" again at Guiyun Manor near Lake Tai and they engage in battle. Zhu Cong being a master at this, pickpockets Mei when he dusts her clothes after the fight and obtains the human skin copy of the manual and leaves it in Guo's possession.

When Guo goes to Peach Blossom Island to seek Huang Rong's hand-in-marriage, he meets Zhou Botong there and they become sworn brothers even when Zhou was already past his prime age and Guo was no more than 20. Zhou still has with him a copy of the original first volume of the manual and he shares it with Guo as he was a martial arts maniac if could not understand the art he would pester anyone for it since Wang forbade his school to learn it Zhou was also forbidden to learn he shared it with Guo as he found a suitable candidate to practise the skill and show it to him without him violating his senior wish. The first volume and the human skin copy of the second volume are then recompiled and imprinted in their memories.

Guo incorporates parts of the manual's skills into his own repertoire of martial arts and becomes stronger. The power of his Eighteen Subduing Dragon Palms is enhanced after the Nine Yin Manual'''s skills worked wonders by increasing his inner energy. His future spouse Huang Rong also benefits from the book. They later pass their knowledge of the manual to Yideng and their teacher Hong Qigong to help them recover from their internal injuries.

Many decades later, after realising that Xiangyang (and the Song Dynasty) will eventually fall to Mongol invaders, Guo writes a copy of the Nine Yin Manual from memory and hides it inside the blade of the Heaven Reliant Sword (the latest edition of the third novel The Heaven Sword and Dragon Saber has inscribed metal plates inside the sword, which are maps to the scrolls' location on Peach Blossom Island). He gives this sword to his younger daughter Guo Xiang, who will become the founder of the Emei School in the third novel.

Ouyang Feng
Ouyang Feng forces Guo Jing to produce a copy of the manual for him in his bid to become the most powerful fighter in the jianghu. Huang helps Guo write a fake copy of the book, with some changes to the text that only a really seasoned martial artist with the sense of contentment  can detect. Some numbers were changed and verses were written in reverse order.

When Huang Rong is taken hostage by Ouyang Feng later, he forces her to translate the last few verses in his copy obtained from Guo. Huang subtly changes the translated text and causes further complications. The result of all those "edits", ironically, increases Ouyang's powers but also causes him to become insane.

Emei School
Years before Zhou found the Nine Yin Manual, Chang Yuchun of the Ming Cult was wounded by a monk working for the Yuan government, who used the 'Heart Shattering Palm' on him. Chang's injury was so serious that he only managed to live until the age of 39.

Guo Xiang founds the Emei School and she is the only person who knows the secret in the Heaven Reliant Sword. The mystery is only passed down from the school's leader to her successor. A century later, Zhou Zhiruo succeeds Miejue as leader of Emei and she is tasked with retrieving the hidden scrolls in the sword. Zhou breaks the sword by clashing it against the Dragon Slaying Saber and obtains the Nine Yin Manual hidden in the sword's blade. She follows the shortcuts inscribed on the manual in her practice and masters the 'Nine Yin White Bone Claw', 'Heart Shattering Palm', and 'White Boa Whip Skill', just like Mei Chaofeng had done before her. As Huang had the time to spend to think of the fastest way to learn the skill without the prospects of danger, Zhou trains to learn the same techniques in a safer and less poisonous way. Zhou also teaches the Wudang School's renegade Song Qingshu the 'Nine Yin White Bone Claw'.

Zhou encounters the Yellow Dress Maiden, a descendant of the Condor Hero Couple (Yang Guo and Xiaolongnü), while wreaking havoc in the jianghu after Zhang Wuji betrayed her love. The Maiden uses an orthodox version of the skills in the Nine Yin Manual'' against Zhou and defeated her easily. Later when Zhou is injured by the Xuanming Elders' 'Xuanming Divine Palm' (玄明神掌), Zhang Wuji uses his 'Nine Yang Divine Skill' to heal her but it negates her 'Nine Yin Inner Energy'.

Notes

Condor Trilogy
Fictional books